The All the Women I Am Tour was a concert tour headlined by country singer Reba McEntire, who visited Canada, the United States, and the United Kingdom in support of her album All the Women I Am. It was McEntire's first solo tour since the Key to Your Heart Tour in 2007.

Background
McEntire announced the tour during a press conference for the Country Music Hall of Fame. She states after being on the road with Strait and Womack for over a year, she and her team have designed a new show with new staging, etc. Opening the concerts for the singer will be fellow country musicians; The Band Perry, Steel Magnolia and Edens Edge. Further details for the tour were available through McEntire's Twitter account and official website. With the tour announcement, McEntire was named the biggest female box office draw in country music. She has sold over nine million tickets and earned over $270 million in ticket sales.
 
To introduce the tour, McEntire says:"I am very excited about the fall tour. We are designing new production and staging. I'm looking forward to touring with The Band Perry, Steel Magnolia and Edens Edge. It will be a night of great music and I'm planning on having a blast."

Opening act
Victoria Banks (Canada)
The JaneDear Girls (Bangor)
Shana Stack Band (Gilford)
The Band Perry (United States)
Edens Edge (United States) (select dates)
Steel Magnolia (United States) (select dates)

Setlist

Tour dates

Festivals and other miscellaneous performances

Box office score data

Broadcasts and recordings
The concert at the Cajundome in Lafayette, Louisiana, was filmed for an upcoming television special. A newsletter was sent out to McEntire's fan club announcing a competition for 300 fans to attend the taping. According to Erin Burr of Big Machine Records, the airdate and station will be announced at a later date. It is McEntire's first concert taping since 1995.

External links
Reba McEntire Official Website

References

Reba McEntire concert tours
2011 concert tours
2012 concert tours